LBU is a three-letter acronym that may refer to:
Universities
 Leeds Beckett University in Leeds, England
 Loughborough University in Loughborough, England
 Louisiana Baptist University, an unaccredited Bible college in Louisiana, USA
 Lucian Blaga University of Sibiu in Sibiu, Romania
 Lumbini Buddhist University in Lumbini, Nepal
 Pennsylvania State University in Pennsylvania, USA, whose football program is sometimes referred to as Linebacker University

Other
 Labuan Airport, Labuan, Malaysia airport code
 Labu language, ISO 639-3 language code 
 Leaflet bomb unit, a type of cluster munition for dropping propaganda from aircraft